The Hallberg-Rassy Monsun 31 is a Swedish sailboat designed by Olle Enderlein in GRP and built between 1974 and 1982. The yacht is known for its traditional long keel, high build quality and sleek lines as a blue water cruiser. It is the best selling Hallberg-Rassy sailing boat to date with 904 hulls built.

Design 
The Monsun is a Bermudan rigged masthead sloop with an aft cockpit and a mahogany interior. The design was based on Hallberg-Rassy's larger sister model, Rasmus 35, and was one of the first models to use Hallberg-Rassy's signature windscreen, which was innovative at the time. It has an encapsulated fuel tank inside the keel under the engine and was delivered with a 23 hp inboard diesel engine.

Famous voyages 
Kurt Björklund did three and a half circumnavigations of the planet on his Monsun, 'Golden Lady', before retiring it in the Råå museum in Scania, Sweden.

References

Sailing yachts
Keelboats
1970s sailboat type designs
Sailboat type designs by Olle Enderlein
Sailboat types built in Sweden
Sailboat types built by Hallberg-Rassy